The Creuse is a  long river in western France, a tributary of the Vienne. Its source is in the Plateau de Millevaches, a north-western extension of the Massif Central.

Course
The Creuse flows northwest through the following departments and towns:

 Creuse department (named after the river): Aubusson.
 Indre department: Argenton-sur-Creuse, Le Blanc.
 Indre-et-Loire department : Yzeures-sur-Creuse, Descartes
 Vienne department: La Roche-Posay

It receives its longest tributary, the Gartempe, in La Roche-Posay.

The Creuse valley is the setting for paintings by the so-called Crozant School, including works by Armand Guillaumin and a series of vivid landscapes by the Bordeaux artist Alfred Smith.

Dams and lakes

There are six hydroelectric dams on the river. Three are in the Creuse département with one at Chambon-Sainte-Croix above Anzême, one at Les Chezelles near Le Bourg-d'Hem and one at L'Âge upstream of La Celle-Dunoise. The remaining three are in the Indre including the Éguzon Dam which was opened in 1926 and was, at the time, the largest dam in Europe. The lakes created by the dams are popular tourist destinations and several have artificial beaches and leisure facilities.

Main tributaries

Left bank:
 Beauze
 Sédelle
 Gartempe

Right bank:
 Rozeille
 Petite Creuse
 Bouzanne
 Bouzanteuil
 Suin
 Claise
 Esves

References

External links
 

Rivers of Centre-Val de Loire
Rivers of Creuse
Rivers of France
Rivers of Indre
Rivers of Indre-et-Loire
Rivers of Nouvelle-Aquitaine
Rivers of Vienne